Mehnaz Akbar Aziz is a Pakistani politician who has been a member of the National Assembly of Pakistan since August 2018.

Early life and career
Mehnaz completed the Masters in Anthropology from the Quaid-i-Azam University and another Masters in Gender and Development Studies from the University of Sussex.

She was elected to the National Assembly of Pakistan as a candidate of Pakistan Muslim League (N) (PML-N) from Constituency NA-77 (Narowal-I) in 2018 Pakistani general election. She received 106,366 votes and defeated Muhammad Tariq Anis.

References

Living people
Pakistani MNAs 2018–2023
Year of birth missing (living people)
Quaid-i-Azam University alumni
Alumni of the University of Sussex
Women members of the National Assembly of Pakistan
21st-century Pakistani women politicians